Mahant Shreyonath (1904–1985) was the Health Minister of the Indian state of Haryana and sixth chief/ Mahant of the Nath sect of Hinduism. Shreyonath succeeded his guru Shri Purna Nath Ji on 28 February 1939. After 39 years he gave Deeksha in 1978 to Mahant Chandnath. He became associated with the Baba Mastnath Math in Asthal Bohar in Rohtak. He established eye hospital on 1 May 1948 and Mahavidyalya to build healthy and educated community.

See also
 Mahant Totanath 
 Mahant Meghnath 
 Mahant Moharnath 
 Mahant Chetnath 
 Mahant Purannath 
 Mahant Shreyonath 
 Mahant Chandnath 
 Mahant Balaknath

References

Indian Hindus
1904 births
1985 deaths